Hygrobatidae is a family of prostigs in the order Trombidiformes. There are about 9 genera and at least 40 described species in Hygrobatidae.

Genera
 Aciculacarus
 Aspidiobates
 Atractides C. L. Koch, 1837
 Australiobates
 Hopkinsobates
 Hygrobates C. L. Koch, 1837
 Notohygrobates
 Zelandobatella
 Zelandobates

References

Further reading

 
 
 
 

Trombidiformes
Acari families